Los Hijos de Don Juan is an Ecuadorian dark comedy-drama television series created by Fabrizio Aveiga for TC Televisión. The series represents the lives of four men, sons of the same father, and they discover him just when he dies, after leaving them in charge of his business.  It premiered on July 15, 2015 on TC Televisión. In February 2016, TC Televisión renewed the show for a second season, which premiered on March 1, 2016.

Premise 
The series revolves around Francisco, Gonzalo, Salvador and Mauricio, the four are children of the same father and discover him just when he dies. After almost thirty years, four men discover that they are brothers. They are children of a womanizer, who never recognized them and who after his death inherits each of them, the administration of different premises of a shopping center. They know Sammy Silva, Don Juan's adopted daughter. These five children are forced to live together and work together, that's where a story of humor, love and entanglements begins, between them and the employees of the shopping center.

Cast

Main  
 Victor Araúz as Francisco Silva "Paco" 
 Leonardo Moreira as Gonzalo Silva "Chalo"
 Isaam Eskandar as Salvador Silva
 Jose Urrutia as Mauricio Silva "Chicho" 
 Maria Fernanda Perez as Sammy Silva 
 Jasú Montero as Ruperta Palomeque
 Sofia Caiche as Zoila Bella
 Mayra Jaime as Maria Jose Patino "Pepa" 
 Jose Corozo as Chavorino
 Sheryl Rubio as Malibu (season 2)
 Carmen Angulo as Madame Trouche
 Santiago Naranjo as Juan Silva 
 Jonathan Montenegro as Amir Santander (season 2)

Recurring  
 Joselyn Gallardo as Juliett Peralta (season 2)
 David Reinoso as Kassandro / Francisco Silva "Paco" 
 Claudia Camposano as Saskia Mena Mora 
 Elena Gui  as Sara María 
 Juan José Jaramillo as Gustavo
 Génesis Aviles as Amelia Silva
 Jessica Ibáñez as Mamaza
 Flor María Palomeque as "La Mofle"
 Alex Vizuete as Francisca "Paca" (season 2)
 Santiago Naranjo as Juan Silva (season 1)
 Priscilla Negrón as Luminitza (season 2)

Production

Development 
The series was created, produced and written by Fabrizzio Aveiga for TC Televisión. The series is the first comedy produced by TC Televisión.

The series premiered on TC Televisión on July 14, 2015. The production of the series began on March 14, 2015 in Guayaquil, Ecuador, at the beginning a season of 20 episodes was recorded, but after seeing the success obtained on TC Television, decided to record more episodes of the series and renew the series for a second season. On March 1, 2016, the second season of the series was released.

Episodes

References

External links 
 TC Television official Site

Ecuadorian comedy television series
2015 Ecuadorian television series debuts
2016 Ecuadorian television series endings
2010s Ecuadorian television series
Spanish-language television shows
TC Televisión original programming